Chadwick Everette Russell (born 27 January 1999) is a Bahamian footballer who plays for Dynamos FC and the Bahamas national football team.

International career
Russell made his senior international debut on 7 September 2018, playing all ninety minutes of a 4-0 away defeat to Belize.

References

External links

Chadwick Russell at playmakerstats.com (English version of ogol.com.br)

1999 births
Living people
Bahamian footballers
Bahamas international footballers
Association football midfielders